The men's modern pentathlon at the 2012 Summer Olympics in London was held on 11 August. Three venues were used: the Copper Box (fencing), Aquatics Centre (swimming) and Greenwich Park (horse-riding and combined running and shooting).

David Svoboda from the Czech Republic won the gold medal with an Olympic record-breaking score of 5,926 points. Cao Zhongrong, 2010 Asian Games gold medalist, won China's first ever Olympic medal in modern pentathlon, taking the silver. Meanwhile, Hungary's Ádám Marosi claimed the bronze medal. For the first time in the post-Soviet era, Russia missed out of the medal podium in the men's event, as current world champion Aleksander Lesun and defending champion Andrey Moiseev finished fourth and seventh place, respectively.

Competition format
The modern pentathlon consisted of five events, with all five held in one day. The format was slightly different from the typical modern pentathlon, with two events combined at the end.

 Fencing: A round-robin, one-touch épée competition. Score was based on winning percentage.
 Swimming: A 200 m freestyle race. Score was based on time.
 Horse-riding: A show jumping competition. Score based on penalties for fallen bars, refusals, falls, and being over the time limit.
 Combined running/shooting: A 3 km run with pistol shooting (the athlete must hit five targets in 70 seconds) every 1 km.  Starts are staggered (based on points from first three events) so that the first to cross the finish line wins.

Schedule
All times are British Summer Time (UTC+1)

Results
Thirty-six athletes participated.

Records
For the first time in Olympic history, the men's modern pentathlon has broken multiple Olympic records in the every sporting discipline, with the exception of horse-riding.

References

Modern pentathlon at the 2012 Summer Olympics
Men's events at the 2012 Summer Olympics